The men's pole vault event at the 2016 IAAF World U20 Championships was held at Zdzisław Krzyszkowiak Stadium on 21 and 23 July.

Medalists

Records

Results

Qualification
Qualification: 5.35 (Q) or at least 12 best performers (q) qualified for the final.

Final

References

Pole vault
Pole vault at the World Athletics U20 Championships